East Early College High School (EECHS) is a secondary charter school at 220 N. Milby Street in Houston, Texas, United States with a ZIP code of 77003.

The school is operated by the Houston Independent School District in association with the Houston Community College System Southeast Campus and the Bill and Melinda Gates Foundation. The school is on the HCC Southeast Campus.

EECHS is a 2018 recipient of the U.S. Department of Education's Blue Ribbon School of Excellence award.

History
East Early College High School opened in fall 2006. It was supported by the Houston Independent School District, Houston Community College, the Bill and Melinda Gates Foundation, and the Texas High School Project. Following EECHS' inaugural year, Texas Education Agency awarded the school with an "Exemplary" rating.

By 2009, construction began on the HCCS Felix Fraga Campus and the new East Early College facility. The facility, located at 220 N. Milby St. in Houston, TX, opened in August 2009 and was named in honor of Leonel Castillo, a Latino community activist in Houston, TX.

In 2012, under the leadership of Principal Tamera Bolden, East Early College High School received the National Blue Ribbon Award from the U.S. Department of Education - the highest award a school can receive. In November 2018 - the first year of eligibility since the 2012 award - Principal Stephanie Square accepted East Early's second National Blue Ribbon Award in Washington D.C.

Student body
As of August 2019, East Early College High School serves about 460 students and their families.

Admissions
Students interested in attending East Early College High School are required to submit applications.

References

External links

 East Early College High School
 

Houston Independent School District high schools
University-affiliated schools in the United States
Early College High Schools
Charter high schools in Houston